Badrinath Ki Dulhania is a 2017 Indian romantic comedy film written and directed by Shashank Khaitan and produced by Dharma Productions. A spiritual successor to Humpty Sharma Ki Dulhania (2014), the film stars Varun Dhawan and Alia Bhatt. It follows the story of an aspiring independent air hostess from a small town who refuses to conform to the patriarchal expectations of her chauvinistic fiancé.

It is the final installment of the Dulhania franchise. Principal photography commenced in May 2016 and took place in Panvel, Singapore and Kota. The film was theatrically released in India on 10 March 2017 during the Holi weekend and became a financial success, earning over ₹200.45 crores worldwide.

At the 63rd Filmfare Awards, Badrinath Ki Dulhania received 8 nominations, including Best Film, Best Director (Khaitan), Best Actor (Dhawan) and Best Actress (Bhatt), and won Best Male Playback Singer (Arijit Singh for "Roke Na Ruke Naina").

Plot 
Badrinath "Badri" Bansal is the youngest son of a wealthy family in Jhansi. In a flashback, it is shown that Badri's elder brother, Aloknath "Alok" Bansal was madly in love with a girl and was going to leave the family for her because their father disapproved, but decided against it after their father Ambarnath "Ambar" Bansal's first heart attack. Now Alok is married to Urmila Shukla through an arranged marriage and she is not allowed to work despite being very intelligent and better professionally trained than Alok himself. Alok is also depressed at having to leave his love and be forced into a marriage, so he spends a lot of his time drinking. Badri fears the same fate for himself and so when he sees the beautiful and educated Vaidehi Trivedi at a wedding supposedly being looked after by her father Mayank, he falls for her immense beauty and charm. He eventually becomes obsessed with her and makes it his mission to marry her with Ambar's approval.

Vaidehi is an intelligent young woman, much more educated than Badri. She has completed her graduation and is secretly training to become a flight attendant while Badri has only passed the tenth grade. She's initially uninterested in getting married and is offended by his marriage proposal because once she fell for a boy named Sagar and decided to marry and start a business with him, but he fooled her family and ran away with all her money. Badri learns about this and questions Vaidehi why she always runs from marriage proposals.

Badri helps Vaidehi's elder sister, Kritika find a husband in local singer Bhushan Mishra and even resolves a dowry crisis with Bhushan's father Jitendra Mishra, after which Vaidehi agrees to marry him. On their wedding day, however, Vaidehi does not show up is revealed to have run away to Mumbai. Furious, Ambar commands a heartbroken Badri to find Vaidehi and bring her back so they can punish her. Despite being afraid of Ambar's words, Badri goes to Mumbai to find Vaidehi, where he discovers that she's already moved to Singapore for a flight attendant training program.

Badri shows up on Vaidehi's doorstep in Singapore, and kidnaps her, pulling her into his car. On the way, he pulls over and lets her out of the car trunk and they have an emotional yet heated argument. Badri is furious at her for leaving him at the altar and she apologizes, trying to assure him that the reason she left was not because of him. Badri grabs her by the throat while venting out all his frustration and anger on her, when a police car pulls up and is about to arrest Badri for violently approaching Vaidehi, and while she defends him, they both are doubted and Badri is taken to the police station anyway and Vaidehi comes along for testifying. At the police station, Vaidehi covers up for Badri. Over the next few days, Badri follows Vaidehi. Alok calls and tells him that Ambar has started looking for other brides. This terrifies Badri and he attempts entry into Vaidehi's workplace. She stops him and tells him she'll marry him only if he can convince Ambar to let her work and live in Singapore. Badri gets drunk that night and causes a scene outside Vaidehi's residential building and he is arrested by the police again, where this time Vaidehi has to pay $1500 to bail him out.

Badri moves into Vaidehi's apartment where she cares for him by cooking for him before leaving for work every day, which humbles him. They spend time together with friends and tour Singapore together. Over time, Badri begins to respect Vaidehi's independence and is impressed by her job and intelligence. He also remembers Urmila and feels sorry that she doesn't get to work, telling Vaidehi that she would be proud of her. Badri and Vaidehi begin to spend more time together which causes them to grow closer. When Ambar calls, Badri lies and tells him that he hasn't found Vaidehi yet, and so Ambar tells Badri to return home. When Badri receives his passport back, Vaidehi invites him to party with her and his newly made friends. Later that night, Badri confides to Vaidehi that he feels she would be a lucky charm of a wife for her future husband. The next day Badri leaves for Jhansi and Vaidehi starts to miss him, depressed by his absence.

Back in Jhansi, Urmila is pregnant and Ambar holds a mega-pooja to ensure that a boy is born. Badri feels sorry for her and misses Vaidehi at the same time, finally understanding why she ran away. Before the pooja, he gets heavily drunk and berates Ambar for being disrespectful towards women. He blames Ambar for being the reason that he can't have Vaidehi when suddenly he sees Vaidehi from the corner of his eye. She tells him that she loves him and wants to marry him. Together they stand up to Ambar and tell him that they will get married and Vaidehi will work as she pleases regardless of whether he agrees or not.

In the epilogue, it is shown that Badri and Vaidehi maintain a long-distance relationship while she finishes her training program in Singapore before moving back to India and starting her own flight attendant training center. Urmila gives birth to twins, one boy and girl, and it is shown that so far Ambar has been treating both of them equally. She also starts working in the family's car showroom with Alok and even gets her own cabin. Badri and Vaidehi promise not to collect any dowry for any of their children. The film ends with Badri and Vaidehi driving off on his motorbike, happily reunited.

Cast 
 Varun Dhawan as Badrinath "Badri" Bansal 
 Alia Bhatt as Vaidehi Trivedi : Sagar's Former Fiancé; Badri's love interest turned - wife
 Rituraj Singh as Ambarnath "Ambar" Bansal: Badri's father
 Yash Sinha as Aloknath "Alok" Bansal: Badri's brother
 Shweta Basu Prasad as Urmila Shukla Bansal: Alok's wife
 Swanand Kirkire as Mayank Trivedi: Vaidehi's father
 Kanupriya Pandit as Manasvi Trivedi: Vaidehi's mother
 Sahil Vaid as Somdev Mishra: Badri's best friend
 Sukhmani Lamba as Kritika Mishra [née Trivedi]: Bhushan's wife 
 Aparshakti Khurana as Bhushan Mishra: Kritika's Husband
 Rajendra Sethi as Jitendra Mishra: Bhushan's father
 Aakanksha Singh as Kiran Kakkar: Vaidehi's friend in Singapore 
 Gaurav Pandey as Gurmeet Singh Lamba: Vaidehi's friend in Singapore and Kiran's boyfriend 
 Gauahar Khan as Laxmi Shankar: a cop in Singapore
 Atul Narang as Sagar: Vaidehi's Former Fiancé.

Production 
Badrinath Ki Dulhania marks the second installment of a franchise that began with the romantic comedy Humpty Sharma Ki Dulhania (2014), which was also directed by Shashank Khaitan, produced by Karan Johar for Dharma Productions and starred Varun Dhawan and Alia Bhatt. The film was first announced on 3 May 2016 with the release of an online motion poster featuring Dhawan and Bhatt at a local village fair. Principal photography also began on the same day. Some of the scenes were also shot at the Ghatotkach Circle, Kishore Sagar Lake and Seven Wonders Park in Kota, Rajasthan.

Soundtrack 

The music for the film has been composed by Amaal Mallik, Tanishk Bagchi and Akhil Sachdeva while the lyrics have been written by Kumaar, Shabbir Ahmed, Akhil Sachdeva, Badshah and Indeevar. The soundtrack was released on 14 February 2017 by T-Series.

The song "Humsafar" was originally composed by Akhil Sachdeva. "Tamma Tamma Again" is a recreation of the song "Tamma Tamma" produced by Bappi Lahiri for the 1990 film Thanedaar. In turn, "Tamma Tamma" itself was based on two songs from Mory Kanté's 1987 album Akwaba Beach: "Tama" and "Yé ké yé ké".

The title track "Badri Ki Dulhania" appears to be inspired by the song "Chalat Musafir" from the film Teesri Kasam (1966), which in turn was inspired by a Bihari folk song. Arijit Singh won the Best Playback Singer (Male) in the Filmfare Awards 2018 for his rendition of the song "Roke Na Ruke Naina".

Critical reception 
On the review aggregation website Rotten Tomatoes, the film has a rating of 80%, based on ten reviews, with an average rating of 6.43/10.

Nihit Bhave from Times of India rated the film 3.5/5 and stated "Badrinath Ki Dulhania is a rucksack full of radioactive social issues handled cautiously". He also praised Varun Dhawan and Alia Bhat's chemistry saying, " Together, Varun Dhawan and Alia Bhatt are the best thing that could have happened to our screens". Rohit Vats from Hindustan Times gave film 2.5/5 and noted that Varun Dhawan by portraying a Jhansi boy, reminds of Govinda. Shubhra Gupta from The Indian Express gave film 3/5 saying, "Alia Bhatt is pitch-perfect as dulhania with a mind of her own. Varun Dhawan impresses as a boy-struggling-to-be-a-man. Together, they offer us a flavourful romance which takes down patriarchy." Tushar Joshi from DNA India described the film as light, entertaining and likeable. He writes, "Varun Dhawan and Alia Bhatt prove that on screen chemistry can be enough sometimes to keep you engaged in an average plot with a predictable narrative". Anupama Chopra of Film Companion gave the film 3 out of 5 stars and said, "Think of Badrinath ki Dulhania as a dose of feminism-lite. I was smiling through the film.
...Varun excels as Badri. He has an earnestness that connects instantly.  He captures each nuance of Badri – his longing for Vaidehi, his confusion and hurt and the eventual transformation of his rage into understanding and respect." Raja Sen of Rediff gave the film 3 out of 5 stars and said, "What makes Badrinath Ki Dulhania work, really, is the intent and the two principal actors." Rajeev Masand of CNN-IBN gave 2.5 stars out of 5, commenting "Writer-director Shashank Khaitan evidently bites off more than he can chew. Badrinath Ki Dulhania isn’t merely interested in being a breezy rom-com. Admirably, it’s also a critique on the dowry system, and makes a strong case for a woman’s right to choose career over marriage. Unfortunately some of this is communicated in a tone that’s too heavy-handed, and as a result you’re easily bored."

Box office 

Badrinath Ki Dulhania netted 12.25 crore in India on its opening day. On the second and third day, it earned 14.75 crore and 16.05 crore nett, taking total opening weekend domestic nett collection to 43.05 crore. The film grossed 73.66 crore nett domestically in its opening week. It netted 27.08 crore in its second week, in which it had entered the 100 Crore Club, taking two weeks total nett collection at 100.74 crore.

Awards and nominations

References

External links 

 
 
 Badrinath Ki Dulhania at Bollywood Hungama

2017 films
2010s Hindi-language films
2017 romantic comedy films
Films scored by Amaal Mallik
Indian sequel films
Indian romantic comedy films
Fox Star Studios films
Films shot in Rajasthan